The men's bantamweight event was part of the boxing programme at the 1948 Summer Olympics. The weight class was the second-lightest contested, and allowed boxers of up to 54 kilograms. The competition was held from Saturday to Friday, 7 to 13 August 1948. Thirty boxers from 30 nations competed.

Medalists

Results

Jimmy Carruthers was not able to fight in the quarterfinals against Tibor Csík after suffering an eye injury during his bout with Arnoldo Parés.

References

External links
 

Bantamweight